Aiding the enemy may refer to:

 Uniform Code of Military Justice, Article 104
 "Aiding the Enemy!" (Pokémon episode), a 2008 episode of Pokémon